Maskal may refer to:
 Maskal, Chitradurga, Karnataka, India
 Maskal, Perm Krai, Russia
 Maskal (singer), Malawian Afro-R&B singer
 Maskal, Tumakuru, Karnataka, India
 Maskal, Bidar, Karnataka, India

See also
 Meskel, a Christian holiday in the Ethiopian Orthodox and Eritrean Orthodox churches